Ahmed Faraj Hussein Al Masli   (born March 4, 1979) was a Libyan international footballer. He was also a member of the Libyan national team.

Career
By scoring against Al Hilal on November 21, 2008, al-Masli has now scored against every team in the Libyan Premier League. He is the only player ever to do so.

After an impressive couple of seasons with Ahly Benghazi (2008–10), it was announced that the Egyptian Premier League side El-Entag El-Harby had signed the striker on a two-year deal.

On December 27, 2011, the Tunisian Ligue Professionnelle 1 side Club Athlétique Bizertin had signed the striker on a one year and al half deal.

External links

1979 births
Living people
Libyan footballers
Libya international footballers
2006 Africa Cup of Nations players
Association football forwards
Expatriate footballers in Kuwait
Al-Ittihad Club (Tripoli) players
Al-Arabi SC (Kuwait) players
Kuwait Premier League players
Libyan expatriate sportspeople in Kuwait
Libyan expatriate footballers
Stade Tunisien players
Libyan expatriate sportspeople in Tunisia
Expatriate footballers in Tunisia
Al-Hilal SC (Benghazi) players
El Entag El Harby SC players
Egyptian Premier League players
Tersana SC players
Libyan expatriate sportspeople in Egypt
Expatriate footballers in Egypt
CA Bizertin players
People from Benghazi
Al-Nasr SC (Benghazi) players
Al-Ahly SC (Benghazi) players
Libyan Premier League players